Staręga is a Polish surname. Notable people with the surname include:

 Maciej Staręga (born 1990), Polish cross-country skier
 Monika Hojnisz-Staręga (born 1991), Polish biathlete

See also
 

Polish-language surnames